Davinson Monsalve (born 9 June 1984) is a Colombian professional footballer who most recently played as a centre back for Patriotas Boyacá.

Honours 
Deportes Tolima
 Copa Colombia (1): 2014

External links 
 
 

1984 births
Living people
Colombian footballers
Deportes Tolima footballers
Atlético Nacional footballers
Alianza Petrolera players
Atlético Bello footballers
Atlético Huila footballers
Atlético Bucaramanga footballers
Once Caldas footballers
Patriotas Boyacá footballers
Categoría Primera A players
Association football defenders
Sportspeople from Antioquia Department